The Newcomb Cleveland Prize of the American Association for the Advancement of Science (AAAS) is annually awarded to author(s) of outstanding scientific paper published in the Research Articles or Reports sections of Science.  Established in 1923, funded by Newcomb Cleveland who remained anonymous until his death in 1951, and for this period it was known as the AAAS Thousand Dollar Prize. "The prize was inspired by Mr. Cleveland's belief that it was the scientist who counted and who needed the encouragement an unexpected monetary award could give." The present rules were instituted in 1975, previously it had gone to the author(s) of noteworthy papers, representing an outstanding contribution to science, presented in a regular session, sectional or societal, during the AAAS Annual Meeting. It is now sponsored by the Fodor Family Trust and includes a prize of $25,000.

Recipients
List of winners

Current rules

Previous rules

See also
 AAAS Award for Science Diplomacy
 AAAS Award for Scientific Freedom and Responsibility
 AAAS Philip Hauge Abelson Prize
 AAAS Prize for Behavioral Science Research

References

Science and technology awards
Awards established in 1923
American Association for the Advancement of Science
American awards
1923 establishments in the United States